Swimming is among the sports which is being contested at the 2019 South Asian Games. Swimming is being hosted in the International Sports Complex, Satdobato between December 5 and 9, 2019.

Medal table

Medalists

Men's events

Women's events

References

External links
Official website

Swimming at the South Asian Games
2019 South Asian Games
Events at the 2019 South Asian Games
South Asian Games
Swimming in Nepal